Akpan, also known as akassa,  is a fermented maize yogurt. A product of Togolese and Beninese cuisine, it is considered a dessert.

Preparation 
Akpan is made by fermenting maize kernels or powder. The fermented maize is then bagged together with condensed milk and iced to create a sweet dessert. Some sources describe the dish as vegetable yogurt.

The dessert is popular in Benin and Togo. In Benin, the dish is referred to as Akassa. It has a small consumer base in France.

References 

Desserts
Beninese cuisine
Togolese cuisine